Kuršėnai (Samogitian: Koršienā;  Kurshon; ;) is the twenty-fifth largest city in Lithuania. According to the 2020 estimate, it had 10,829 residents.

History
The town's name was first documented in the 16th century. According to historian , its name is derived from word kuršis (Curonian). However, according to folk etymology, the town didn't have a name for a long time. But, one summer day the river Venta flooded and washed all hay bales which were standing at the river banks. People started questioning each other: where is the hay? where is the hay? („Kur šienai? Kur šienai?“). Since then, the town name stayed as Kuršėnai.

Since a clay that is ideal for fine ceramics was detected near Kuršėnai, pottery has long been thriving in the city. In the last century, Kuršėnai became famous for fairs abundant in earthenware. Kuršėnai is called the “Capital of Potters” not only due to the abundance of such handicraftsmen in the city but also because the All-Time Potter's Crown has been solely won by the folk artists of Kuršėnai such as J. Paulauskas, V. Damkus, B. Radeckas, and J. Vertelis. It clearly is no coincidence that a pitcher is one of the elements of the Coat of Arms of the city.

The history of Kuršėnai Manor begins in 1564 when Sigismund Augustus gave the said manor as a fief to George Despot-Zenovich, the Castellan of Polotsk. Soon, a settlement began to grow in the manor lands on the other side of the Venta, and in 1569 the first wooden church was erected. In 1621, the estate went to S. Pac, the Grand Treasurer of the Grand Duchy of Lithuania, and a decade later the manor became the property of George Gruzewski and his wife. At the end of the 18th century, Kuršėnai were inherited by Stephen Gruzewski. Having brought in the artist J. Rilke with the apprentice team, he built a new (current) manor house and a chapel and renovated other buildings in 1811. The estate flourished still further under ruling of his younger son Edward who took it over in 1846.

Kuršėnai Manor has the most valuable heritage of wooden manorial architecture in Šiauliai District. The original staircase, window frames, and wooden front doors have survived.

The estate of Kurshan was under Russian rule from 1795 to 1914, first in the Vilna Governorate and from 1843 in the Kovno Governorate. The mansion and the park were devastated by the Germans who occupied the manor during the First World War and took away the most valuable things. In 1914 the town's Jewish population was expelled by the Russian army, who accused them of collaborating with the Germans. The fire of 1915 destroyed the peasant farms, barns, and sheds. The manor belonged to George Gruzewski at that time. Owing to advanced farming, the estate was flourishing during the interwar period. The manor was nationalized in 1940.

Outside the manor, the town itself began to grow in 1873 when a railway station was built here.

In 1939 there were around 900 Jews living in the village (out of the total population of around 3000). Their persecution began in July, 1941. Immediately following the arrival of the Germans a Lithuanian partisan squad was formed in Kuršėnai. They arrested supporters of the Soviet regime and assigned the Jews to various forced labor tasks. When a ghetto was set up in Kuršėnai by an order of Nazi authorities many Jews were housed in the two synagogues. At the end of July a group of Lithuanian nationalists (white armbanders) and police seized approximately 150 to 168 Jewish men and murdered them in a mass execution in a nearby forest, about three kilometers from city.

Economy

Kuršėnai is famous as a place of pottery craftsmen.

Famous dishes
Kuršėnų vyniotinis, a type of sweet rolled pastry with cheese curd filling, was named after the town. The dessert was created by Eugenija Dragūnienė, a gulag survivor who opened a local confectionery store after her release.

Famous people
 Stasys Raštikis, Lithuanian army general 
 Donald Kagan, Yale Classics professor
 Vacys Reimeris, poet
 Stasys Lipskis
 Arieh Kubovy, chairman of Yad Vashem
 Kazimiera Kymantaitė (1909-1999), Lithuanian film and actress and stage director

References

 
Cities in Šiauliai County
Cities in Lithuania
Shavelsky Uyezd
Holocaust locations in Lithuania
Šiauliai District Municipality